Muir High School may refer to:

John Muir High School (Pasadena, California)
Bishopbriggs Academy in Bishopbriggs, Scotland once known as Thomas Muir High School